Clarkenia cantamen is a species of moth of the family Tortricidae. It is endemic to Ecuador (Tungurahua Province).

The ground colour of the forewings is silvery white with minute black and grey-black dots and black markings. The hindwings are pale brownish grey, but whitish basally, with pale brownish grey spots.

References

External links

Moths described in 2002
Endemic fauna of Ecuador
Euliini
Moths of South America
Taxa named by Józef Razowski